William Chalmers may refer to:
William Chalmers (merchant) (1748–1811), Swedish merchant whose bequest founded the Chalmers University of Technology
William W. Chalmers (1861–1944), U.S. Representative from Ohio
William Chalmers (1880s footballer) (died 1940), Scottish footballer
William Chalmers (banker), interim CEO of Lloyds Banking Group
William Chalmers (footballer, born 1901) (1901–1997), Scottish footballer (Liverpool, Tranmere Rovers, St Johnstone)
William Chalmers (footballer, born 1912) (1912–1943), Scottish footballer (Raith Rovers, Bournemouth, Barrow)
William Chalmers (ice hockey) (1934–1994), hockey player
William Chalmers Burns (1815–1868), Scottish missionary to China
William Chalmers (bishop) (1833–1901), Anglican Bishop of Goulburn
William Scott Chalmers (1888–1971), admiral in the Royal Navy

See also
Billy Chalmers (1907–1980), Scottish football player and manager
Stewart Chalmers (William Stewart Chalmers, 1907–1989), Scottish footballer